Alex or Alec or Alexander Kennedy may refer to:
Alexander Kennedy (martyr) (died 1539), Scottish martyr
 Alec Kennedy (1891–1959), English cricketer
 Alexander Kennedy (1847–1928), British engineer and academic
Alexander Kennedy (physician) (1764–1827), Scottish surgeon and antiquary
Alexander Kennedy (colonist) (1837—1936), Scottish colonist of Queensland
 Alexander Kennedy, known as Sandy Kennedy (fl. 1875–1884), Scottish footballer
 Alex Kennedy (British Army soldier), youngest British soldier to receive the Military Cross since 1945
 Alex Kennedy (footballer) (1893–1985), Australian footballer
 Alex Kennedy (rower) (born 1992), New Zealand rower
 Alex Kennedy (racing driver) (born 1992), American stock car racing driver